The Poland men's national floorball team is the men's national floorball team of Poland, and a member of the International Floorball Federation (IFF). The Poland men's team is currently ranked 11th in the world at floorball following their result at the 2020 Men's World Floorball Championships. Its biggest success is ninth place at 2010 Men's World Floorball Championships.

The Poland National Team is organized by Polski Unihokej.

Roster 
The following is the roster for 2020 World Championships.

Team Staff 
Head Coach - Joel Olofsson 

General Manager - Adam Troy 

Assistant Coach - Vidar Jonsson Wallin 

Team Manager - Ari Huttunen 

Team Official - David Brown 

Physiotherapist - Julia Olofsson

References 

Men's national floorball teams
National sports teams of Poland